Nitin Sawhney   (born 1964) is a British musician, producer and composer. A recipient of the Ivor Novello Lifetime Achievement award in 2017, among multiple international awards throughout his career. Sawhney's work combines Asian and other worldwide influences with elements of electronica and often explores themes such as multiculturalism, politics, and spirituality. Sawhney is also active in the promotion of arts and cultural matters, is chair of the PRS Foundation, on the senate of the Ivor Novello Academy, on the board of trustees of theatre company Complicité, and is a patron of numerous film festivals, venues, and educational institutions. In 2021 he was an ambassador for the Royal Albert Hall.

Sawhney has scored for and performed with orchestras, and collaborated with and written for Paul McCartney, Sting, the London Symphony Orchestra, A. R. Rahman, Brian Eno, Sinéad O'Connor, Jacob Golden, Anoushka Shankar, Jeff Beck, Shakira, Will Young, Joss Stone, Taio Cruz, Ellie Goulding, Horace Andy, Cirque du Soleil, Akram Khan, Deepa Mehta, Mira Nair, Nelson Mandela, Ojos de Brujo, Hélène Grimaud, Natacha Atlas, Jools Holland, Jorja Smith, John Hurt and Pink Floyd. Performing extensively around the world, he has achieved an international reputation across multiple artistic mediums.

Often appearing as Artist in Residence, Curator or Musical Director at international festivals, Sawhney contributes to musical education, having acted as patron of the British Government's Access-to-music programme, the East London Film festival and, currently, Artis as well as acting as a judge for The Ivor Novello Awards, BAFTA, BIFA and the PRS foundation. He is a recipient of 7 honorary doctorates from British universities, is a fellow of LIPA and the Southbank University, an Associate of Sadler's Wells, sits on the board for British theatre company Complicite. In 2017, Sawhney received the Ivor Novello Lifetime Achievement award.

Having turned down an OBE in 2007, stating it was associated with "a colonial past", Sawhney accepted a higher-grade CBE in the 2019 New Year Honours. He accepted it for his father, who he said had died regretting that Sawhney had rejected the OBE.
 
Since 2014, the publishing interest of Nitin Sawhney's catalogue has been represented by Reservoir Media Management.

Early years
Nitin Sawhney was raised in Rochester, Kent, England, by first-generation British Indian parents. As a child he studied piano, classical and flamenco guitar, sitar and tabla. He has been quoted speaking about his early life as one of three brothers and his musical influences: "My mum and dad both listened to Indian classical music, but also flamenco, Cuban music, a lot of crooners and a lot of pop. My brothers listened to a lot of rock music. So, I was listening to everything from the Doors to Led Zeppelin and a lot of jazz."

He attended Sir Joseph Williamson's Mathematical School. Subsequently, he studied law at Liverpool University for a short time.

Sawhney moved to London, where he met up with old university friend Sanjeev Bhaskar; together they created the comedy team The Secret Asians. The pair were given a show on BBC Radio, which eventually grew into the award-winning BBC TV sketch show Goodness Gracious Me. Refocusing on music, Sawhney's solo career began in 1993, when he released his debut album, Spirit Dance on his own label.

Solo career

Sawhney has released over 20 studio albums. He has received 17 major national awards for his album work and is a recipient of the Ivor Novello Lifetime Achievement award.
 
In 1999 Sawhney released his fourth Gold-selling album, Beyond Skin, on London's Outcaste Records, which took a prestigious Mercury Music Prize nomination and won Sawhney the coveted South Bank Show Award. After a subsequent signing to Richard Branson's V2 Records, Sawhney released the Silver-certified Prophesy in 2001, winning a MOBO Award as well as a BBC Radio 3 Music Award. Sawhney's seventh album, Philtre, was released in May 2005, taking yet another BBC Radio 3 Award and in 2008, his eighth album, London Undersound, released on Cooking Vinyl, featured artwork by Antony Gormley and performances from Paul McCartney, Anoushka Shankar, Imogen Heap and Natty, amongst many others.

Sawhney's 2011 studio work, Last Days of Meaning, previewed at the Royal Albert Hall in May 2011, centres on a character from actor, John Hurt, and follows the metaphorical, Dickensian journey of a lonely and intransigent man. His 2013 box-set release One Zero was recorded live-to-vinyl as a celebration of ten albums releases. Nitin's tenth studio album, Dystopian Dream, was released in November 2015, and his eleventh Immigrants came out in March 2021.

He produced Anoushka Shankar's 2013 Grammy nominated album Traces of You, featuring Norah Jones, and also produced Jools Hollands' 2021 album Pianola. Piano & Friends.

Music for film, television and video games
To date, Sawhney has scored over fifty films as well as many international TV programmes, ads and cinema trailers. Sawhney has written music for a wide variety of contexts, from dark, high-tension drama to light hearted animatronics.

Sawhney has been commissioned to write the scores for a number of different projects. His music for Channel 4's Second Generation received a nomination for the Ivor Novello Award for Film and TV Composition. He has also scored ads for Nike and Sephora. In 2006, Sawhney composed a new symphony to accompany Franz Osten's 1929 silent film, A Throw of Dice, which premiered with the London Symphony Orchestra at the Barbican, London. Other notable works include scores for Oscar-nominated director Mira Nair's adaptation of Jhumpa Lahiri's, The Namesake, as well as Natural Fantasia and Human Planet for the BBC.

His work for film and television has led Sawhney to gain recognition within the world of classical music. In 2001, Sawhney composed "Neural Circuits" for the Britten Sinfonia In 2002, he worked with Akram Khan and Anish Kapoor, scoring the music to Khan's choreographed work Kaash, which toured worldwide between 2002 and 2003. In 2004, Sawhney was commissioned by the City of Birmingham Symphony Orchestra to compose a new piece for their Harmony Project. His previous scores also include the new adaptation of Mahabharata by the Olivier Award- winning writer Stephen Clark, Simon McBurney's A Disappearing Number for Complicité, and first-time theatrical director Jonathan Holmes' Fallujah. Sawhney has continued to work with Akram Khan on Bahok, Vertical Road and iTMOi (in the mind of Igor).

Sawhney produced the music for the Ninja Theory video games Heavenly Sword and Enslaved: Odyssey to the West (both starring Andy Serkis).

Sawhney again worked with the London Symphony Orchestra for the Network/BFI re-master of Alfred Hitchcock's The Lodger, performed live at The Barbican Centre on 21 July 2012. Sawhney also scored Oscar-nominated director Deepa Mehta's adaptation of Salman Rushdie's book, Midnight's Children, released October 2012 (US) and Vara: A Blessing and Japan in a Day.

Sawhney scored a five episode series for the BBC's Natural History Department called Wonders of the Monsoon which had its debut airing with the BBC in 2014. With other broadcasters and with its DVD release it has been re-titled Lands of the Monsoon. The series earned Sawhney a Royal Television Society award for best composer in February 2015. He subsequently scored Andy Serkis' (whom he has previously worked with) directorial debut Breathe, (featuring Andrew Garfield and Claire Foy) which went on general release in October 2017, and Serkis' interpretation of The Jungle Book, titled Mowgli: Legend of the Jungle for Netflix, released in November 2018.

Theatre and dance

Sawhney's album Dystopian Dream has been made into a full stage show with Sadler's Wells, co-devised with Honji Wang and Sébastien Ramirez, which premiered in Luxembourg on 29 September 2017. Sawhney's substantial theatre/dance credits include the scores for Complicite's Olivier Award-winning A Disappearing Number and Akram Khan's also Olivier Award-winning Zero Degrees, for which Nitin received a New York Performance and Dance Award for best score. After scoring Bahok for the Royal Ballet of China, Sawhney's composition for Khan's Vertical Road received a best new work award in Melbourne. Sawhney worked again with Belgian choreographer Sidi Larbi Cherkaoui on a production based on the life of Manga creator, Tezuka and has worked with Akram Khan for iTMOi (in the mind of Igor) as part of the centenary Rites of Spring celebrations at Sadler's Wells. Sawhney directed and produced Indelible a multi-installation experience at Sadler's Wells as part of their "NoBody" programme.

Acting, writing, directing, commentating

Sawhney's acting credits include the award-winning radio and BBC TV series, Goodness Gracious Me, for which he received a Sony Award as performer and writer, Meera Syal's Radio 4 mini-series, Masala FM and Confluence with Akram Khan. As a fledgling theatrical director, his work to date includes Confluence for Sadler's Wells and directing/writing workshops at London's National Theatre for his play, Trust. He has also written articles for UK broadsheets and appeared as a commentator on the BBC's Newsnight Review, Newsnight and HardTalk. Nitin Sawhney Spins the Globe is Sawhney's BBC Radio 2 show. Its fourth series was broadcast in March 2015.

Sawhney appeared as an industry expert in two series of the TV series Guitar Star for Sky Arts, as well as appearing in and working as music director on the Sky Arts series Tony Visconti's Unsigned Heroes, which aired in 2017.

Collaborations and remixes

Sawhney has remixed a wide variety of artists, including Sting, Natacha Atlas, Nusrat Fateh Ali Khan, Jeff Beck, Julian Lloyd Webber, Tina Grace and Paul McCartney (for McCartney's The Fireman project). He also collaborated with McCartney on a song called "My Soul", which appeared on Sawhney's London Undersound album, and on various Robert Miles projects such as Miles Gurtu and Organik as well as with American singer-songwriter Jacob Golden. His own work has been remixed by 4hero, Talvin Singh, MJ Cole and Quantic. He produced several songs on Cheb Mami's album Dellali. He co-produced the second album from songwriter Get Cape. Wear Cape. Fly entitled Searching for the Hows and Whys released through Atlantic Records. During 2006–2007, he wrote the music for Akram Khan and Sidi Larbi Cherkaoui's dance piece Zero Degrees; Antony Gormley created the set. He played keyboards on the 2022 Pink Floyd single, "Hey, Hey, Rise Up!".

Sawhney also had his own BBC Radio 2 series: Nitin Sawhney Spins the Globe, which was commissioned for three series. The series has seen him collaborate with the likes of Joss Stone, Bassekou Koyate, One Eskimo, Diana Yukawa and David Arnold. Sawhney also produced and co-wrote Anoushka Shankar's 2013 album – Traces of You which featured Norah Jones. He also co-produced an album by the semi-classical all female string quartet Bond.

Live

Sawhney is an acclaimed flamenco guitarist and classical/jazz pianist. His musical ability to transcend cultural barriers has gained him much recognition from the classical and pop communities, leading to his unique claim to broadcasting and selling out as artist in his own right for both the BBC Traditional and Electric Proms at London's Royal Albert Hall and Roundhouse respectively. His band has toured the world for decades and Sawhney has performed and scored in recent years with international orchestras to silent films, most notably Alfred Hitchcock's The Lodger, Franz Osten's A Throw of Dice and Naruse's Yogoto No Yume all for the London Symphony Orchestra.

Nitin has conducted both the London Symphony Orchestra and the Singapore Festival Orchestra and wrote his first choral piece for London Contemporary Voices Choir. He performed at London's Royal Albert Hall in September 2014 where he showcased tracks from his tenth studio album, Dystopian Dream. Sawhney musically directed a tribute to the rock musician Jack Bruce at London's Roundhouse in October 2015, and was also musical director for the show Tony Visconti: A Life in Music at London's Union Chapel in 2017.

Sawhney, given his classical background, is an experienced and established DJ, mixing styles from Afro-beat and Dubstep to Asian breakbeat and drum 'n' bass. Performing at London's tastemaking Fabric nightclub, Sawhney has DJed at The Big Chill, Womad, Womadelaide and across the world at numerous major festivals. Clubland has seen three international DJ album releases by Sawhney; All Mixed Up – The Definitive Remix Collection; Fabriclive 15 and In the Mind of... Nitin Sawhney.

Awards
1998
EMMA Award for Displacing The Priest
2000
Asian Pop Award for Best Mainstream Fusion Act for Beyond Skin
Technics Mercury Music Prize Nomination for album of the year for Beyond Skin
South Bank Award for Popular Music for Beyond Skin
2001
BBC Asia Award for Music for Prophesy
MOBO Award for Prophesy
Boundary Crossing Award, BBC Radio 3 Music Awards for Prophesy
2002
Media Personality of the Year nomination, RIMA Awards
EMMA Award for Prophesy
Muso Award for Prophesy
2003
Commission for Racial Equality Award
2004
Ivor Novello Award Nomination for Best Film score for TV
2005
Boundary Crossing Award, BBC Radio 3 Music Awards for Philtre
2006
Honorary Graduate Degree from South Bank University, London
Laurence Olivier Award in Contemporary Dance (Zero Degrees – scored for Akram Khan)
2007
Honorary degree of Doctor of Music from the University of Kent
2008
Companionship From the Liverpool Institute for Performing Arts in recognition of his contribution to the world of art and entertainment.
 UK Asian Music Awards – "Commitment to Scene"
2009
 UK Asian Music Awards – "Best Alternative Act"
 Honorary Doctorate from the University of Sussex
 Honorary Doctorate from the University of Roehampton
 Honorary Doctorate from the University of Staffordshire
 "Best Music (Melhor Trilha Sonora)" Jury Award Nomination for Jean Charles (2009)
2011
 "Best Specialist Factual" BAFTA Nomination for Human Planet
 "Best Original Video Game Score" Ivor Novello Award Nomination for Enslaved: Odyssey to the West (Ninja Theory)
2012
 "Outstanding Dance Production" Dora Mavor Moore Award Nomination for Confluence (co-directed)
 Honorary Doctorate from Goldsmiths College
2015
 Winner of Royal Television Society's Composer Award for BBC's Wonders of the Monsoon
2017
 Recipient of the Ivor Novello's Lifetime Achievement Award
2019
 Recipient of the Outstanding Achievement in Music award at The Asian Awards.

Additional information
Much of Sawhney's attention remains focused on the areas of education and community building, accepting the role of Artist in Residence for no less than five separate performing arts organisations across Great Britain and Asia. Sawhney joined Sir George Martin as a patron of the national music college Access to Music, and he is also patron of the Raindance East Film Festival and the British Independent Film Awards. Sawhney appears regularly as an arts and current affairs commentator on topical discussion and news programs such as the BBC's Newsnight, Newsnight Review, and HARDtalk. He has also written for UK national broadsheet newspapers: The Guardian, The Daily Telegraph, The Independent, and The Observer.

In June 2019 Sawhney was the guest on BBC Radio 4's Desert Island Discs. His favourite choice was Massive Attack's remix of "Mustt Mustt" by Nusrat Fateh Ali Khan: his book choice was The Fabric of Reality by David Deutsch.

Discography

Albums

Compilations
 Introducing Nitin Sawhney (1999) Outcaste
 FabricLive.15 (2004) Fabric
 All Mixed Up (2004) V2
 In the Mind of... (2007) District 6

Scores

References

External links
 – official site

 
 
 
 

1964 births
Living people
English DJs
Asian Underground musicians
People from Rochester, Kent
English people of Indian descent
21st-century composers
English film score composers
English male film score composers
English television composers
English male composers
English record producers
People educated at Sir Joseph Williamson's Mathematical School
Musicians from Kent
British trip hop musicians
21st-century British male musicians
Downtempo musicians
Nu jazz musicians